Vala State or Vallabhipura was a non-salute princely state in India during the British Raj until 1948. The centre was the city of Vallabhi. The last ruler of the state signed the state's accession to the Indian Union on 15 February 1948.

History 

Vala (Vallabhipura) princely state was founded in 1740 by Thakore Sahib Akherajji of nearby Bhavnagar (also in Gohelwar prant; later a salute state under a Maharaja), a Gohil Rajput of the Suryavanshi clan, for his twin brother Visaji, who became the first Thakore. It was one of the many states in Saurashtra, mostly petty states. It comprised 40 villages, covering 492 Square Kilometers km2. In 1921 it had a population of 11,386 (13.285 in 1903–4). Its state revenue was 225,000 Rupees (in 1903–4, mainly from land; later 341,773 Rupees), and it paid 9,202 Rupees tribute to the Gaekwar Baroda State and to Junagadh State.

It was a native state of British India in charge of the colonial (originally Eastern -) Kathiawar Agency of the Bombay Presidency., later merged into the Western India States Agency.
 
It ceased to exist by accession to freshly independent India's then state Saurashtra (now part of Gujarat) on 15 February 1948. The privy purse was fixed at 520,000 Rupees.

Ruling Thakurs 
The rulers bore title of Thakore Sahib.

1740 – 1774  Visaji  (d. 1774)
1774 – 1798  Nathubhai Visaji, succeeded his above father (d. 1798)
1798 – 1814  Meghabhai Nathubhai  (d. 1814)
1814 – 1838  Harbhamji Megabhai, succeeded his above father  (d. 1838)
1838 – 1840  D(a)ulatsimhji Harbhamji, succeeded his above father  (d. 1840), childless
1840 – 1853  Patabhai Megabhai, son of above Meghabai  (d. 1853)
1853 – 1860  Prithvirajji Patabhai  (d. 1860)
1860 – 20 August 1875   Meghrajji Prithvirajji  (d. 1875)
20 August 1875 – 1943   Vakhatsinhji Meghrajji, succeeded his above father  (b. 1864 – d. 1943)
1943 – 15 August 1947   Gambhirsinhji Vakhatsinhji, succeeded his above father, signed the accession to India  (b. 1889 – d. 19..) which ended the polity.

The line was nominally continued.

References

Sources and external links 
 Imperial Gazetteer on DSAL.UChicago.edu – Kathiawar

Kathiawar Agency
Princely states of Gujarat
Rajput princely states
Bhavnagar district
Gohils
States and territories disestablished in 1948
1948 disestablishments in India